Wollerton is a small village within the civil parish of Hodnet in Shropshire, England.  It lies approximately three miles to the south west of Market Drayton and sits on the old A53 and adjacent to the new Hodnet bypass which forms the new route of the A53. Since the construction of the Hodnet bypass, Wollerton's public house, The Squirrel, has closed and no other amenities other than a URC chapel remain.

The village used to have a railway station, Wollerton Halt on the Wellington and Drayton Railway until the line was dismantled in 1970.

The Old Hall is a Grade II* listed building.

See also
Listed buildings in Hodnet, Shropshire

References

Villages in Shropshire